At the 1896 Summer Olympics, four swimming events were contested, all for men.  They were planned and organized by the Sub-Committee for Nautical Sports.  All events took place on 11 April in the Bay of Zea.  There was a total of 13 participants from 4 countries competing.

Medal table

Medal summary
These medals are retroactively assigned by the International Olympic Committee; at the time, winners were given a silver medal and subsequent places received no award.

Participating nations
A total of 13 swimmers from 4 nations competed at the Athens Games:

Sub-Committee for Nautical Sports
 Prince George of Greece, president
 Pavlos Damalas, secretary
 Dimitrios Kriezis
 Konstantinos Sachtouris
 Georgios Koundouriotis
 Dimitrios Argyropoulos
 Konstantinos Kanaris
 K. Argyrakis

References

External links

 

 
1896 Summer Olympics events
1896
1896 in swimming